Wat Phrathat Doi Kong Mu is an ancient Thai Buddhist temple in Mae Hong Son province, northern Thailand, considered as a provincial temple.

Formerly known as Wat Plai Doi (วัดปลายดอย, "temple on mountaintop"), because it is located on Doi Kong Mu hill 1,300 m (4,265 ft) above sea level, southern west of Amphoe Mueang Mae Hong Son. While the hill name Kong Mu is Shan language means "the stūpa". The monastery was built with Tai Yai architecture style mixed with Burmese style.

The most striking of the temple are two large whitewashed stūpas. The largest stūpa was built in 1860 by wealthy Tai Yai merchant named Chong Tong Su, it enshrines the relics of Maudgalyāyana, one of the chief disciples of the Lord Buddha. These relics were brought from Mawlamyine in Myanmar. While another stūpa next to it was built in 1872 by Phraya Singhanatracha who was a first governor of Mae Hong Son. This  stūpa contains relics of Śāriputra that were brought from Mandalay.

The temple and the hill are also a scenic viewpoint of Mae Hong Son.

The temple was registered as an archaeological site of Mae Hong Son province by the Fine Arts Department in 1979.

Gallery

References

External links
Wat Phra That Doi Kong Mu formerly known as Wat Plai Doi

Tourist attractions in Mae Hong Son province
Buddhist temples in Thailand
Religious buildings and structures completed in 1872
19th-century Buddhist temples
Overseas Burmese Buddhist temples
Buddhist temples in Mae Hong Son Province
Ancient monuments in Thailand